= CNSL =

CNSL may refer to:

- Canadian National Soccer League
- Cashew nutshell liquid
